Barack Obama won the 2008 United States presidential election on November 4, 2008. During campaign, by using social media and mobilizing the general public online, Obama was able to raise awareness and financial support of his campaign Obama used over 15 social networking sites.

The topic of Barack Obama's usage of social media in his political campaigns, including podcasting, Twitter, Myspace, Facebook, and YouTube has been compared to the adoption of radio, television, MTV, and the Internet in slingshotting his presidential campaign to success and as thus has elicited much scholarly inquiry. In the 2008 presidential campaign, Obama had more "friends" on Facebook and Myspace and more "followers" on Twitter than his opponent John McCain.

Obama's usage of the wider Internet has often since been compared to Franklin D. Roosevelt and John F. Kennedy's adoption of the radio and television media, respectively, in the history of communication between the White House and the American public.

Obama was the first of his kind to utilize the wider internet such as Twitter, Face book and other social media platforms. In fact president Obama has been called the “first social-media president" (The Atlantic ). Although most likely many presidents before him would have used social media if it was thriving in their time you cant say they would have nearly as much success as Obama. Obama had a special drive, outlook and perspective when it came to this new platform of communication. Obama and his team learned early on the algorithm to success. Which was able to help unlock an effective communication tool that can be utilized to great lengths by many government officials today.

Twitter

Barack Obama's Twitter account (@BarackObama) is the official account on social networking site Twitter for former President of the United States Barack Obama, and has been used for his election efforts. Obama also used the White House's Twitter account (@WhiteHouse) for his presidential activities. , Obama's account has 132,465,713 followers, making him the owner of the most followed Twitter account. Obama also follows 581,980 accounts, and has posted 16,563 tweets. Well into 2011, it was following the most people of any account on the network and was the third to achieve ten million followers. It is one of only two accounts in the world to be in the top ten in both followers and followees (Twitter friends). , the White House account is also among the two-hundred most followed with nearly three million followers. On May 18, 2015, Obama sent his first tweet from the first Twitter account dedicated exclusively to the U.S. President (@POTUS); his first reply to a tweet directed at him was a tongue-in-cheek exchange with former President Bill Clinton (@billclinton).

Obama has used Twitter to promote legislation and support for his policies. Obama is also the subject of various debates on Twitter. He had also used his account to respond to the public regarding the economy and employment. Based on its rate of adoption, Twitter will have a complementary role to other communication efforts that is more significant in Obama's 2012 presidential campaign than in prior elections.

Statistics on Twitter usage

The account is among the top ten worldwide in both followers and followed. The account held the record for following the most people. On August 13, 2019 at 14:39 PDT Obama's account overtook Katy Perry and has the most number of followers with over 107 million followers, and followed 612,655 accounts.

During his 2008 campaign the account was intermittently the world's most followed. In May 2010 Obama's Twitter account ranked as the fourth most followed account with about 4 million followers. By May 16, 2011, @BarackObama was followed by 7.4 million people, including twenty-eight world leaders. His account became the third account to reach 10 million followers in September 2011.

Obama twitter statistics and engagement were truly incredible and unlike any political candidate has ever scene. Although Obama was a revolutionist in using the power house twitter to win in political elections he cant take all the credit. Although he did constantly post and reach millions on this platform monthly. Twitter was the most popular social media app of this time in fact Numbers and studies show that Twitter reached its peak growth rate on its platform with  new user in the time stent of 2007-2010. Although Obama and his team did put in extensive work on this app every day. Some must ask is Obama due for all the credit within his success or did his success mainly come fromt he crazy growth Twitter saw within this time.

Account usage history

@BarackObama was launched on March 5, 2007 at 16:08:25. It is his official account, although he also tweeted through @WhiteHouse which is usually used by the presidential administration, while @BarackObama was for his election campaign staff. @WhiteHouse predates the Presidency of Barack Obama, since it was created on April 21, 2007. Following the 2008 United States presidential election, the Democratic National Committee was believed to have taken over the account and in a speech in November 2009, Obama stated "I have never used Twitter", although he had over 2.6 million followers. The @BarackObama account is "run by #Obama2012 campaign staff. Tweets from the President are signed -bo." Although his staff does most of his tweeting, Obama became active on the account in June 2011, tweeting under his own initials, beginning with the father's day message "Being a father is sometimes my hardest but always my most rewarding job..."

Obama has at various times held public forums in which he fielded questions posted on Twitter. On July 6, 2011, he participated in what was billed as "Twitter Presents Townhall @ the White House". The event was held in the East Room of the White House and was streamed online. Only written questions on the site about the economy and jobs were accepted for oral response by Obama. His average responses were over 2000 characters and when Speaker of the United States House of Representatives John Boehner tweeted "Where are the jobs?" to the hashtag #AskObama, it took Obama 3111 characters to respond. The event was moderated by Twitter executive Jack Dorsey, and Obama started the session with a sample tweet to himself through @WhiteHouse that said "in order to reduce the deficit, what costs would you cut and what investments would you keep – bo". Dorsey said afterwards that Twitter received over 110,000 #AskObama-hashtagged tweets. Boehner was quite active with his questions from the outset. Some in the media proposed May 24, 2012, as the date when Obama became the first President to respond to questions on Twitter. It has been stated that "Political content creation is also tightly linked with the use of social media platforms such as online social networks, video sharing sites, blogs and status update services such as Twitter."

On July 29, 2011, during the United States debt-ceiling crisis, the account lost over 40,000 followers when the president asked "Americans Friday to call, email and tweet Congressional leaders to 'keep the pressure on' lawmakers in hopes of reaching a bipartisan deal to raise the nation's $14.3 trillion debt limit ahead of an August 2 deadline." During the day, he sent about 100 tweets that included the Twitter accounts of Congressional Republicans. Later in 2011, Obama used Twitter again to try to encourage the people to voice their opinion on legislation when he was attempting to pass the American Jobs Act.

 use this source and add informaction to strethen this section here

Hacking
On January 5, 2009, Obama's campaign account @BarackObama was among several celebrity accounts that were hacked and domain hijacked. The hacker phished the password of a Twitter administrator's account, gaining access to other accounts to which he then changed the passwords, and subsequently offered access to accounts upon request at Digital Gangster. The case eventually led to a non-financial settlement with the Federal Trade Commission by Twitter.

On July 4, 2011, Obama was the subject of a death hoax on Twitter when Fox News' Politics Twitter account (@foxnewspolitics) was hacked. The hackers were unfamiliar with Twitter and started their hoax messages with @BarackObama, thus only making the message appear in the Twitter timelines of those who follow both Fox News and the Presidential account. Eventually the hackers switched to hashtag references, increasing the visibility of their activities. Fox News acknowledged the breach and apologized.

Significance of Twitter in campaigning

Although both Obama and his Republican adversary Mitt Romney were active on Twitter and Twitter has "become an essential tool for campaigns", the Pew Research Center has determined that only about 13% of American adults had joined the site. Thus, Twitter's impact on the election was only "one slice of an enormous communication effort". Its impact grew significantly that as many tweets are sent in 8 minutes as were sent on all of Election Day 2008. As of May 25, 2010, 48% of Obama's followers resided outside of the United States and 47% were female. At that time, the top five industries in which his followers were employed were
 Hospitality,
 Law,
 Marketing/Public Relations,
 Fashion and
 Education.
Measuring social influence has become a new consulting career opportunity. According to discussants on the PBS NewsHour, Obama has 5,000 times as much social media influence as Romney; however, according to The Hill, Obama only has 12 times as much social media influence.

 I want to expand this section by adding significant information to strengthen this section from this article

The Change in Campaigns

Being that Barack Obama was the first presidential candidate to use social media, he helped the immense realization that Social Media can greatly help one's campaign. Upon this realization social media was able to contribute to helping candidates raise money for their campaigns. Previously, much of the resources that candidates utilized came from their own personal financial reserves. In an article written by Pinar Yildirim of University of Pennsylvania, emphasizes on the large amounts of money that are spent on campaigns and on advertising alone. Mike Bloomberg is introduced as an example as he went as far as to contribute more than half of his campaign funds towards his advertising. Social Media has shown to directly impacts funds gained by candidates. These candidates who committed to social media shown to gain small percentages of what they would earn in a two year time.

Other social media platforms

barackobama.com
The official website of Barack Obama is barackobama.com. It is run by Chris Hughes, one of the three co-founders of Facebook, and has been described as a "sort of social network". Steve Spinner, a member of Obama's National Finance Committee, says that while previous campaigns have used the internet none had yet taken full advantage of social networking features. The website included online tools that allowed members to identify neighbors that the Obama campaign thought might be potential backers and then report back on any resulting conversations. By taking full advantage of social networking features it meant that Obama would have saved over a hundred million dollars of TV ad buying by using social media to spread his message. This also meant that Barack Obama did have not rely on big tickets donations and instead could rely on micro-donations of hundreds of thousands of supporters.

Members of the site could also create blogs, post photos, and form groups through the website, but each member must publish limited biographical profile and no more than one photo. According to Hughes, during the 2008 campaign, over two million accounts were created for the website to "organize their local communities on behalf of Barack Obama". He estimates that more than 200,000 events were organised through the website. Moreover, 400,000 articles were written in blogs. Four hundred thousand videos that supported Obama were posted into YouTube via the official website. Thirty-five thousand volunteer groups were created. Thirty million dollars were spent by 70,000 people into their own fundraising webpages. In the final four days of the 2008 campaign, three million phone calls were made through the website's internet virtual phone.

Reddit
President Barack Obama made a surprise half-hour visit to the social news website Reddit on August 29, 2012. Using an Ask Me Anything (AMA) format, the President garnered 3.8 million page views on the first page of his self-post. Users left 22,000 comments and questions for the President, 10 of which he answered. The answered questions' topics included more serious topics, from the most difficult decision made during his first term to a plan to end the corruption of money in politics. Some included a more lighthearted focus, like the recipe for the White House beer.

In response to Obama's use of Reddit, many noted the bypassing of generally established channels of mainstream media in use during the 2012 campaign in favor of less-filtered and closer forms of communication. When asked why Obama logged on to Reddit, one campaign official responded "Because a whole bunch of our turnout targets were on Reddit." By using a newer, underused media channel like Reddit, Obama's campaign acknowledged a largely unaddressed demographic of unlikely voters on social internet boards.

Obama was the first president to utilize the power house platform called reddit. Now what is not mentioned above is that in 2012 Reddit was a very fresh, new platform that averaged less then 50 million users monthly in the US. Obama noticed and saw that the potential of this app and the outreach it had so he striked. Being the first big name to truly profit from this platform. Since Obama found success in his 2012 campaign Reddit had a span of 7 years of blowing up. They went from 50 million users a month to almost a half a billion monthly user in 2019. This goes to show how advanced the Obama team was in seeing pottential of new apps and taking chances on them. Obama and his team were ahead of the curve in so many aspects and Reddit is just one of the perfect examples of this.

Facebook
The Barack Obama Facebook (@barackobama) is currently the official Facebook for the former president and was his Facebook during the campaign trail. Looking back onto the election, Obama was able to mobilize the public through social media, especially Facebook. In fact, by the peak of the Obama campaign, his Facebook has around 3 million friends. Marc Anderson, board member of Facebook and founder of Netscape, said "Other politicians I have met with are always impressed by the Web and surprised by what it could do, but their interest sort of ended in how much money you could raise. He was the first politician I dealt with who understood that the technology was a given and that it could be used in new ways." The use of effective social media campaigns, especially on Facebook, were developed and used under the Obama campaign. The transformation of social media sites into capital gain can show how he was so effective in mobilizing voters and volunteers. "By converting everyday people into engaged and empowered volunteers, donors and advocates through social networks, email advocacy, text messaging and online video. The campaign's proclivity to online advocacy is a major reason for his victory." Through Facebook, Obama was able to create a sense of ethos between the voters and his personal campaign. This created a sense of trust, support and effective campaigning that made his campaign so successful.

In March 2007, the Barack Obama team created an interconnection between a user's account in Obama's official website and Facebook account, so a user may publish activities via sending postings from one to another. In 2008, the Obama presidential campaign spent $643,000 out of its $16 million Internet budget to promote his Facebook account. On June 17, 2008, after Hillary Clinton ended her campaign, the number of followers of Barack Obama's Facebook account increased to one million. Meanwhile, in addition to Facebook accounts of Barack and Michelle Obama and Joe Biden, the Obama team created ten more Facebook accounts for "specific demographics, such as Veterans for Obama, Women for Obama, and African Americans for Obama."

Instagram 
Former President Barack Obama used Instagram extensively during his presidential campaign in 2008 and 2012 and also during his time in office. He used the platform to share personal photos, highlight policy initiatives, and connect with his followers.
During his campaign, Obama's Instagram account was managed by his social media team and focused on sharing behind-the-scenes images of the campaign trail, events, and rallies. He also shared photos of his family, including his wife and children, to help show a more personal side of his candidacy.

After being elected, Obama continued to use Instagram to share photos and messages with his followers. He used the platform to highlight initiatives such as healthcare reform, environmental policies, and education initiatives. He also used the platform to connect with citizens and share inspirational messages.

One of the most popular posts on Obama's Instagram was a photo of him hugging First Lady Michelle Obama after the Supreme Court upheld the Affordable Care Act in 2015. The post received over 1.6 million likes and helped to showcase Obama's dedication to healthcare reform.

Overall, Obama's use of Instagram was seen as an innovative way to connect with younger voters and engage them in the political process. By sharing personal photos and highlighting policy initiatives, he was able to create a more relatable and engaging image of himself and his administration.

See also:

- https://www.forbes.com/sites/alexknapp/2017/01/20/how-barack-obama-used-social-media-to-become-the-first-social-media-president/?sh=2a54c9361c44

- https://www.npr.org/2019/11/22/781812110/from-iowa-to-instagram-how-obama-crafted-a-youth-movement-in-2008

Controversy 
The topic of social media regarding presidential campaigns come with a bit of hesitation to the general public. The concept of micro-targeting is the use of personal information, garnered from online social media sources and public records, builds profiles for that of the voting demographic. Through Obama's successful online presence, his supports and online friends were able to build an incredible amount of information toward his campaign that helped micro-targeting and social media strategy. This received a lot of criticism under the Trump administration due to his policy use of Cambridge Analytica, which a Britain-based company who provides information and strategies for micro-targeting and other tactics along those lines. "Obama's 2008 campaign was famously data-driven, pioneered micro-targeting in 2012, talking to people specifically based on the issues they care about," Cambridge Analytica said on Twitter. The firm, under the Trump Campaign, gathered over 50 million profiles from Facebook to gain information about Facebook users. The Obama campaign team member Micheal Simon, responded to allegations of similar actions with "We didn't steal private Facebook profile data from voters under false pretenses. OFA (Obama's campaign) voluntarily solicited opinions of hundreds of thousands of voters. We didn't commit theft to do our groundbreaking work."

The Final Stats from Obamas Political stent 
The Obama campaign and team when it was all said and done did a lot of good and opened the door to a new way of life. Obama opened the country and the world of politics to the new platform of social media. Obama showed the country and politicians how beneficial this new technology is. He showed how using these platforms can reach the ears and eyes of millions and gain popularity faster than every before. Obama showed politicians  how to get ahead in the polls and set yourself apart from your competitor or other candidate. In his time office Obama accomplished a whole lot.

Summary of Obamas political presidential run

  Obama’s Final Numbers
 The economy gained a net 11.6 million jobs. The unemployment rate dropped to below the historical norm.
 Average weekly earnings for all workers were up 4.2 percent after inflation. The gain was 3.7 percent for just production and nonsupervisory employees.
 After-tax corporate profits also set records, as did stock prices. The S&P 500 index rose 166 percent.
 The number of people lacking health insurance dropped by 15 million. Premiums rose, but more slowly than before.
 The federal debt owed to the public rose 128 percent. Deficits were rising as Obama departed.
 Home prices rose 20 percent. But the home ownership rate hit the lowest point in half a century.
 Illegal immigration declined: The Border Patrol caught 35 percent fewer people trying to get into the U.S. from Mexico.
 Wind and solar power increased 369 percent. Coal production declined 38 percent. Carbon emissions from burning fossil fuel dropped 11 percent.
 Production of handguns rose 207 percent, to a record level.
 The murder rate dropped to the lowest on record in 2014, then rose and finished at the same rate as when Obama took office.

When its all said in done, Obama Did more good than bad. He changed the world and our views on technology for the better. His tactics on social were so successful that they could be applied to other fields such as help in order for it to gain support. progressed are minds amnesty and opened the country up to the power of social media and the benefits of it.  He dominated the polls and the views of the people of America. He was the peoples choice and loved all the way through by million.  Obama was nothing but a revolutionist, activist, Risk taker, and game changer.

See also
 Donald Trump on social media
 Fireside chats
 Social media and political communication in the United States

Bibliography

References

External links

 Twitter Top 100 followers list @ Twitaholic.com
 Twitter Top 100 followers list @ Twittercounter.com

Social media

E-government in the United States
Obama, Barack
Political communication